The 1984 City of Aberdeen Council election took place on 3 May 1984 to elect members of City of Aberdeen Council, as part of that years Scottish local elections.

Election results

References

1984
1984 Scottish local elections
20th century in Aberdeen
May 1984 events in the United Kingdom